Mudrika Prasad Rai or Mudrika Yadav was an Indian politician. He was elected to the Bihar Legislative Assembly from Taraiya from 2015 Member of Bihar Legislative Assembly as a member of the Rashtriya Janata Dal.

References

People from Saran district
Living people
Bihari politicians
1964 births
Rashtriya Janata Dal politicians
Bihar MLAs 2015–2020